German submarine U-305 was a Type VIIC U-boat of Nazi Germany's Kriegsmarine during World War II. The submarine was laid down on 30 August 1941 at the Flender Werke yard at Lübeck as yard number 305, launched on 25 July 1942 and commissioned on 17 September under the command of Oberleutnant zur See Rudolf Bahr.

During her career, the U-boat sailed on four combat patrols, sinking four ships, before she was sunk on 16 January 1944 in mid-Atlantic, southwest of Ireland.

She was part of eight wolfpacks.

Design
German Type VIIC submarines were preceded by the shorter Type VIIB submarines. U-305 had a displacement of  when at the surface and  while submerged. She had two shafts and two  propellers.

U-305 was fitted with five  torpedo tubes (four fitted at the bow and one at the stern), fourteen torpedoes, one  SK C/35 naval gun, 220 rounds, and two twin  C/30 anti-aircraft guns. The boat had a complement of between forty-four and sixty.

Service history
The boat's service life began with training with the 8th U-boat Flotilla in September 1942. She was then transferred to the 1st flotilla for operations on 1 March.

First patrol
The submarine's first patrol began with her departure from Kiel on 27 February 1943. She passed through the gap between Iceland and the Faroe Islands and into the north Atlantic Ocean. On 17 March she sank Port Auckland and Zouave southeast of Cape Farewell (Greenland), the latter foundering in five minutes. The boat arrived in Brest in occupied France, on 12 April 1943.

Second and third patrols
U-305s second foray was relatively uneventful, starting and finishing in Brest, as would all her remaining patrols, on 12 May and 1 June 1943.

On her third sortie, she sank  on 20 September 1943. The Canadian warship was one of the first victims of a GNAT acoustic torpedo.

Fourth patrol and loss
The boat's final patrol commenced on 8 December 1943. This ship sank in just two minutes, with the loss of 83 men.

U-305 was lost in January 1944. Fifty-one men died; there were no survivors.

Wolfpacks
U-305 took part in eight wolfpacks, namely:
 Stürmer (11 – 20 March 1943)
 Seewolf (21 – 30 March 1943)
 Mosel (19 – 23 May 1943)
 Leuthen (15 – 24 September 1943)
 Rossbach (25 September – 5 October 1943)
 Borkum (18 December 1943 – 3 January 1944)
 Borkum 1 (3 – 13 January 1944)
 Rügen (13 – 16 January 1944)

Summary of raiding history

References

Notes

Citations

Bibliography

 Originally published by Poole in 1986.

External links

German Type VIIC submarines
U-boats commissioned in 1942
U-boats sunk in 1944
World War II submarines of Germany
1942 ships
Ships built in Lübeck
Ships lost with all hands
U-boats sunk by unknown causes
Maritime incidents in January 1944
World War II shipwrecks in the Atlantic Ocean